The China National Highways (CNH/Guodao) is a network of trunk roads across mainland China. Apart from the expressways of China that are planned and constructed later, most of the CNH are not controlled-access highways.

History 

The building of highways is seen as key to accelerating infrastructure construction. In 2003, completed investment in highway construction was 350 billion yuan and 219 key highway projects progressed, focusing mainly on the five north–south and seven east–west national arterial highways as well as highways in western China and in rural areas. By the end of 2004, the total length of highways open to traffic reached 1.871 million km, including  of expressways up to advanced modern transportation standard, ranking second in the world. The nation's highway density has now reached 19.5 km per 100 km2.

With the completion in 2008 of the five north–south and the seven east–west national arterial highways, totaling , Beijing and Shanghai were linked by major highways, chiefly expressways, to the capitals of all provinces and autonomous regions of China, creating highway connections between over 200 cities.

The aim of the National Expressway Network Plan approved in early 2005 is an expressway system connecting all capitals of provinces and autonomous regions with Beijing and with each other, linking major cities and important counties. Half of the projects are already completed.

In 2013 the Ministry of Transport announced the "National Highway Network Planning (2013 - 2030)", which will bring the total number of highways to 119, with 81 connecting highways between them.

In 2022, the NDRC and MOT published a new National Highway Network Plan, added and re-formed several expressways and national highways. It is expected that all national highways will connect all county-level (or above) administrative regions (except those that are parts of Sansha), important national tourist attractions and border checkpoints.

Regulation 

Although an accepted speed limit on China National Highways is 120 km/h, it is common to see cars pass other by in excess of 120 km/h. The lack of speed detection cameras on some routes, lack of a posted speed limit outside of localities and tremendous distances of road mileage, means that enforcing this speed limit is rather herculean. In addition, there is a notable shortage of traffic police in mainland China.

Nationwide highways often begin with the letter GXXX, followed by three numerals, e.g.: G107. It is said that the GXXX stands for 国家 (guójiā), or national.

The numbering of the highways is as follows:

 Five vertical and seven horizontal main routes were labelled in the former 000 series (the so-called "five downs and seven acrosses"), although these have been deprecated in favour of the "NTHS" (7, 11, 18) system.
 Highways in the 100 series (e.g. 102, 106) begin from Beijing - the capital city of the People's Republic of China - and spread out in all compass directions, except for China National Highway 112, which originates in Bazhou as it is a ring road around Jingjinji.
 Highways in the 200 series stretch from north to south (e.g., from Hohhot in Inner Mongolia through to Beihai in Guangxi province);
 Highways in the 300 series stretch from east to west (e.g., from Shanghai through to Ruili in Yunnan province);
 Highways in the 500, 600 and 700 series are connecting roads between other national highways.

In major cities, there is usually a gap in the road within the city.

List of all China National Highways 

Former 000 Series 
Note: 000 Series China National Highways pointed to five specific vertical routes, as well as seven specific horizontal routes. Routes ending in "0" were north–south (vertical) routes; routes ending in "5" were east–west (horizontal) routes. The new system with two to four numbers that indicate the "NTHS" (7918) system is now in use instead of the 000 Series. For the expressways named under the new numbering system, see Expressways of China.

It seems that the old 0xx numbers are still signposted using the format GZXX, e.g. in the Qinghai province, there are signs at the G109 (old G025) showing the number GZ25.

100 Series

200 Series

300 Series

500 Series

600-700 Series

See also 

Expressways of China
Transport in China
Tarim Desert Highway
Karakoram Highway

References

External links 

 Ministry of Transport 
 China Highway & Transportation Society
 China Highway Network

 
China
Highways
Highways